Komendska Dobrava is a dispersed settlement in the hills north of Komenda in the Upper Carniola region of Slovenia.

History

During the Second World War, a Partisan hospital was set up in April 1944 in a gorge south of the village in the Komenda Woods. It operated until June 11, 1944, when it was discovered by German forces, who killed the patients and the medical personnel at the facility, including two nurses and the physician, Tine Zajec (1905–1944).

References

External links

Komendska Dobrava on Geopedia

Populated places in the Municipality of Komenda